"Dreamin'" is a song released as an iTunes single (the fourth from the album) from American alternative rock band Weezer's sixth album, Weezer (2008). It was released in digital form on May 27, 2008.

In the booklet for Rivers Cuomo's demo compilation album Alone, Cuomo describes how the song "This Is the Way" was originally going to be used for the Red Album over "Dreamin'," then called "Daydreamer." Eventually, Cuomo was able to persuade other band members to choose the "epic, 6-minute, symphonic type of art song" Dreamin' instead.

Brian Bell has commented that this song was "actually based on the sonata form" and the breakdown of the song has a formal name ("The Dream Sequence") in response to a question asking what was each band member's proudest moment on the album.

The song was released as a downloadable song for the game Rock Band and its three sequels along with the songs "Troublemaker" and "The Greatest Man That Ever Lived."

The song mentions the Widener Library Stacks at Harvard University where the composer Rivers Cuomo attended and graduated from.

Dreamin' was played live only during the Troublemaker Tour in 2008 and has not been played live ever since.

Track listing

"Dreamin'" - 5:12

Personnel
Rivers Cuomo – lead guitar, lead vocals
Patrick Wilson – percussion, backing vocals
Brian Bell – rhythm guitar, Lead/backing vocals
Scott Shriner – bass guitar, backing vocals

References

Weezer songs
2008 singles
Songs written by Rivers Cuomo
Song recordings produced by Rick Rubin
2008 songs
Geffen Records singles